R517 road may refer to:
 R517 road (Ireland)
 R517 (South Africa)